The World Sprint Speed Skating Championships are annual speed skating championships. The championships are held over a two-day period, with the skaters racing one 500 m and one 1,000 m each day.

Since the higher speeds towards the end of the race tend to favour the skater who skates the last outer lane, each skater starts both distances once in the inner lane and once in the outer lane. The times on those distances are then converted to points using the samalog system, and the skaters are then ranked according to the fewest points.

The International Skating Union has organised the World Sprint Championships for Men and the World Sprint Championships for Women since 1970 and both are held at the same time and venue. The first two years (1970-1971), they were called the ISU Sprint Championships. Since 2020, the men's and women's World Sprint Championships are held every even year – at same time and venue as the men's and women's World Allround Championships.

Hosts

Medal tables (1970-2022)

Sprint championships

Team sprint

Combined all-time medal count

Notes
 - Using the world record per 2012 as an example: at the world championships on 28/29 January 2012, Stefan Groothuis skated his 500 m races in 34.84 and 34.74 seconds, respectively, and his 1,000 m races in 1:07.50 and 1:06.96.  His total score was therefore 34.840 + 34.740 + 33.750 + 33.480 = 136.810 points.

References

 
 

Sprint